Gagan Bhagat is an Indian politician and a senior Hindu leader from Jammu Province of the Jammu and Kashmir National Conference (J&K NC). Dr. Bhagat was a member of the Jammu and Kashmir Legislative Assembly from the Ranbir Singhpura constituency in Jammu district. Bhagat was appointed
as Deputy Chief Spokesperson of Jammu and Kashmir National Conference in March 2022. He is the prominent Hindu face of the party after few Hindu leaders left the J&K NC from Jammu Province.

References 

People from Jammu
Bharatiya Janata Party politicians from Jammu and Kashmir
Living people
Jammu and Kashmir MLAs 2014–2018
Year of birth missing (living people)